Gassulawiya was a Hittite queen of the king Mursili II, ruler of the Hittite Empire (New kingdom) ca. 1321–1295 BC (short chronology).

Family 
Gassulawiya is known to have had several children including a daughter named Massanauzzi (referred to as Matanaza in correspondence with Ramesses II) married to Masturi, a ruler of a vassal state, and three sons named Muwatalli, Hattusili III and Halpasulupi. Mursili had further children with a second wife named Tanuhepa. Their names have not been recorded however.

Illness 
Obviously by the end of her life Gassulawiya endured severe illness, as she addressed the goddess Lilwanis with a substitute statue, in order to be relieved from her illness.

Notes

External links
 UvA-Dare: Prayor to the goddess Lilwanis

Literature 
 , (1998): How Old Was Matanazi?, The Journal of Egyptian Archaeology, Vol. 84. 
 , (1994): Die ägyptisch-hethitische Korrespondenz aus Boghazköi in babylonischer und hethitischer Sprache
 , (1999): Geschichte des hethitischen Reiches, Leiden, Boston, Köln

Hittite queens